Jim Smith is a British author, illustrator and designer who is behind the gift and card range, Waldo Pancake, Head of Design for franchise chain Puccino Coffee as well as creator of the award-winning children's series Barry Loser. I am still not a Loser, Smith's second book in the Barry Loser Series won the Roald Dahl Funny Prize in 2013 for funniest book for children aged 7–14. And the second book in the spin-off series Future Ratboy won The Laugh Out Loud Children's Book Awards in 2017 for 6–8-year olds.

Novels
Barry Loser: I am not a Loser Egmont Books Ltd. 2012  
Barry Loser: I am still not a Loser Egmont Books Ltd 2013 
Barry Loser: I am so over being a Loser Egmont Books Ltd 2013 
Barry Loser: I am nit a Loser: World Book Day Edition Egmont Books Ltd 2014 
Barry Loser: I am sort of a Loser Egmont Books Ltd 2014 
Barry Loser and the Holiday of Doom Egmont Books Ltd 2014 
Barry Loser and the Case of the Crumpled Carton Egmont Books Ltd 2015 
Barry Loser Hates Half Term Egmont Books Ltd 2016 
Future Ratboy and The Attack of the Killer Robot Grannies  Egmont Books Ltd 2015 
Barry Losers Ultimate Book of Keelness Egmont Books Ltd 2015 
Future Ratboy and The Invasion of the Nom Noms 2016

References

Year of birth missing (living people)
Living people
British illustrators
21st-century British artists
21st-century British writers